Wudi was a town in Wudi County, in the northern Shandong province, which is part of the People's Republic of China. In June 2010, with the approval of the provincial and Binzhou municipal governments, it was dissolved, and together with part of neighbouring Xinyang Township, formed Difeng and Haifeng Subdistricts.

See also
List of township-level divisions of Shandong

References

Former populated places in China